Fedir Kindratovych Vovk (Ukrainian Федір Кіндратович Вовк or Russian Фёдор Кондратьевич Волков; 1847–1918) was a Ukrainian anthropologist-archaeologist, the curator of the Alexander III Museum in St. Petersburg.

Vovk graduated from Kyiv University in 1871. He was an active member of the Kyiv Hromada. From 1887 to 1905 he lived in Paris to escape tsarist persecution; he earned a Ph.D. in 1900, and won the Godard Prize for his dissertation. In 1905 he returned to Russia, where, along with his position at the Alexander III Museum, he held a lecturership at Saint Petersburg University. He was granted a professorship at Kiev University in 1917 but died before he could take it up.

Vovk's research concerned the anthropological study of the Ukrainian people; in it he argued that the Ukrainians constituted a separate group of Slavs most closely related to the Southern Slavs (Dinaric race).

References

Further reading
.
.

Ukrainian archaeologists
Ukrainian anthropologists
1847 births
1918 deaths
Hromada (society) members